Brazil has a high level of urbanization with 87.8% of the population residing in urban and metropolitan areas. The criteria used by the IBGE (Brazilian Institute of Geography and Statistics) in determining whether households are urban or rural, however, are based on political divisions, not on the developed environment.

Nowadays, the country has 5,570 municipalities.

With two exceptions, the state capitals are all the largest cities in their respective states: Florianópolis, the capital of Santa Catarina is its second-largest city after Joinville, while Vitória is only the fourth-largest city in Espírito Santo, although it is located in that state's largest metropolitan area.

Most populous cities in Brazil

This is a list of the most populous cities based on the population of the municipality where the city is located, rather than its metropolitan area. As IBGE considers the entire Federal District synonymous to Brasília, the population of the Federal District is shown for Brasília.

IBGE Census counts as of 1 August 2010. Estimates of 1 July 2021

State capitals are in bold and states' largest cities are in italics.

Brazil's population, as recorded by the 2010 census, was of 190,755,799 inhabitants (22.40 inhabitants per square kilometer), with 84.36% of the population defined as urban. The population is heavily concentrated in the Southeast (80.4 million) and Northeast (53.1 million).

Distribution

Largest metropolitan areas

See also
 Municipalities of Brazil
 List of municipalities of Brazil
 List of largest cities in Brazil by state
 List of metropolitan areas in the Americas
 Largest cities in the Americas
 Brazilian Institute of Geography and Statistics

References

Largest cities
Brazil